Paxton Place is a historic home located at Charlottesville, Virginia. It was built about 1824, and is a -story, four-bay, Federal style brick dwelling. It has a side gable roof and two interior chimneys connected by a curtain.  The house has been occupied by the Shisler Funeral Home and the Loyal Order of Moose Lodge.

It was listed on the National Register of Historic Places in 1982.

References

Houses on the National Register of Historic Places in Virginia
Federal architecture in Virginia
Houses completed in 1824
Houses in Charlottesville, Virginia
National Register of Historic Places in Charlottesville, Virginia